The 1946 East Tennessee State Buccaneers football team was an American football team that represented East Tennessee State College (ETSC)—now known as East Tennessee State University—as an independent during the 1946 college football season. In their eleventh, non-consecutive year under head coach Gene McMurray, the team compiled a 7–1 record and outscored opponents by a total of 125 to 56. It would be McMurray's last year as head coach, as he would take over the Physical Education Department at University of Mississippi in 1947. The win total from this season would not be equaled for 16 years and was a high-water mark for the program. The team would be dubbed "The Barefoot Boys" because half of the 70 members trying out for the team had no shoes due to poor funding and being ill-equipped. It took until only three days prior to the game against Brevard that enough shoes had been acquired to outfit the entire team.

Schedule

References

East Tennessee State
East Tennessee State Buccaneers football seasons
East Tennessee State Buccaneers football